Robbie King (born 29 October 1993) is an Australian professional darts player who plays in Professional Darts Corporation events.

Career
King was born in Gold Coast, Queensland, and made his television debut at the 2019 Melbourne Darts Masters. However, he lost 6–2 to Rob Cross in the first round.

World Championship results

PDC

 2020: First round (lost to Ryan Searle 2–3)

Performance timeline
PDC

References

External links

1993 births
Living people
Australian darts players
Professional Darts Corporation associate players
People from the Gold Coast, Queensland
Sportspeople from Melbourne